The Källén function, also known as triangle function, is a polynomial function in three variables, which appears in geometry and particle physics. In the latter field it is usually denoted by the symbol . It is named after the theoretical physicist Gunnar Källén, who introduced it as a short-hand in his textbook Elementary Particle Physics.

Definition
The function is given by a quadratic polynomial in three variables

Applications
In geometry the function describes the area  of a triangle with side lengths :

See also Heron's formula.

The function appears naturally in the kinematics of relativistic particles, e.g. when expressing the energy and momentum components in the center of mass frame by Mandelstam variables.

Properties
The function is (obviously) symmetric in permutations of its arguments, as well as independent of a common sign flip of its arguments:

If  the polynomial factorizes into two factors

If  the polynomial factorizes into four factors

Its most condensed form is

Interesting special cases are

References

Kinematics (particle physics)
Mathematical concepts